Available refers to availability.

Available may also refer to:
"Available", song by Flo Rida, 2009
"Available", song by Frank Sinatra, 1965
"Available", song by Justin Bieber from the album Changes, 2020
"Available", song by Moving Units, 2004